Rendu Rellu Aaru ( stylised as 2X2=6) is a 1986 Indian Telugu-language comedy film, produced by Gogineni.Subba Rao under Vijaya Creations banner and directed by Jandhyala. It stars Rajendra Prasad, Chandra Mohan, Rajani, Preethi  and music composed by Rajan–Nagendra. E. V. V. Satyanarayana worked as associate director to the film. The story is based on a novel of same name by Malladi Venkata Krishna Murthy.

Plot
The film begins with two close friends Sadguna Rao and Madhusudan Rao. Madhu is a peculiar person who troubles everyone with puzzles and interesting questions. Once he is acquainted with a beautiful girl Keerthana in funny circumstances and they fall in love. Keertana also holds a mate Vindhya a stage artist. 

Right now, the story unfolds with Keerthana divulging Vindhya regarding her childhood marriage with a guy Venkata Sivam in their village which she denies and even changed her name from Vighneswari to Keerthana. At present, Keerthana's maternal uncle Dattatreya arrives and forces her to immediately pack to the village to meet her paternal uncle Sarvanandam (Pucha Poornanandam). 

During that plight, Keerthana sends Vindhya instead of her as Paramanadam is blind and deaf. Here surprisingly, Venkatasivam is none other than Madhu one that the same changed his name and thereof he too sends Sadguna Rao to the village requesting him to behave badly and get rid of Vighneswari. After a few comic incidents, Sadguna Rao and Vindhya fall for each other. The rest of the story is about what happens to these two young couples and how things fall in place.

Cast

 Rajendra Prasad as Venkata  Sivam / Madhusudhan Rao "Mad"
 Chandra Mohan as Sadguna Rao "Sad"
 Rajani as Vindhya
 Preeti as Vighneswari / Keertana
 Pucha Poornanandam as Paramanadam
 Suthi Veerabhadra Rao as Airavatam
 Suthi Velu as Gireesam
 B. V. Pattabhiram as himself
 Rallapalli as Tikamaka
 P. L. Narayana as Dattatreya
 Sakshi Ranga Rao as Jagapati Rao
 Potti Prasad as Swamiji
 Bheemeswara Rao as beggar 
 Sri Lakshmi as Lalita
 Kakinada Syamala as Hidimbi
 Dubbing Janaki as Dattatreya's wife
 Jayasree 
 Master Harish as young Venkata Sivam
 Baby Meena as young Vighneswari

Soundtrack

Music composed by Rajan–Nagendra. Lyrics were written by Veturi. Music released on AVM Audio Company.

References

External links

1986 films
1986 comedy films
Films directed by Jandhyala
Films scored by Rajan–Nagendra
Films based on Indian novels
1980s Telugu-language films